Nagyvázsony is a village in Veszprém, Hungary.  It lies approximately 15 km (9 mi) north of the Lake Balaton. It houses Kinizsi Castle, a 14th-century fortification donated by Matthias I to Pál Kinizsi. Kinizsi's sarcophagus can be found in the castle chapel. Facing the castle is a baroque church which was commissioned by Kinizsi in 1470. There is also an ethnographic museum in the village.

Notable residents
 Teddy Kollek (1911-2007), Israeli Mayor of Jerusalem
 Pál Kinizsi (1432-1494), general

Gallery

Twin city
  Mioveni – Romania
  Chorley – United Kingdom

External links 
 Street map (Hungarian)
 Aerial photographs of Nagyvázsony

Populated places in Veszprém County